opened in Shichinohe, Aomori Prefecture, Japan, in 1994 as a part of Roadside Station Shichinohe.

See also
 Aomori Museum of Art
 List of Cultural Properties of Japan - paintings (Aomori)
 List of Important Tangible Folk Cultural Properties
 Mingei

References

External links
  Takayama Uichi Memorial Museum of Art

Museums in Aomori Prefecture
Shichinohe, Aomori
Art museums and galleries in Japan
Museums established in 1994
1994 establishments in Japan